Melkweg (Dutch for "Milky Way") is a music venue and cultural center on Lijnbaansgracht, near Leidseplein in Amsterdam, Netherlands. It is housed in a former dairy and includes 4 music halls as well as a cinema, a restaurant and an exhibition space. It is operated by a nonprofit organisation founded in 1970.

History
The building originally housed a sugar refinery built in the 19th century. In 1920, OVVV bought the factory and used it as a milk factory until it closed in 1969. The building was closed for a year, but reopened by Cor Schlösser and others as a cultural center, with its first event on July 17, 1970. It was only open for the summer; it featured a café, a restaurant and one hall for music and theatre. This was a success: Melkweg reopened in the summer of 1971 and 1972 before becoming a year-round venue in 1973. In the 1980s, it became more focused on live music. In 1985, a photo gallery opened. In 1995, The Old Hall opened, first with a capacity of 1,000 people, expanded to 1,500 in 2007. By 2010, the venue was hosting 400,000 guests annually and was estimated to have hosted 9 million guests since it opened.

Notable events
 In October 1980, U2 played their first concert outside of the United Kingdom at the Melkweg.

 In October 1981, Grateful Dead played an unscheduled show at the venue using borrowed instruments.

 Nirvana played at the venue in November 1989, before they were famous.

 In 1994, Rammstein, then an unknown newly formed band, played a show at the venue that was attended by 40 people.

 In 2011, Prince played a surprise show at the venue, with tickets going on sale one hour before the show started.

In popular culture

Songs referencing the Melkweg
 "Euro-Trash Girl" by Cracker

 "Infectious" by Lagwagon

 "Prag Vec at the Melkweg" by Half Man Half Biscuit

 "Under the Milky Way" by The Church

Albums recorded at the Melkweg
 "Live from the Milky Way" (1995) by Heather Nova

 Performance (1988) by Spacemen 3

 Live at Melkweg (2001) by Frank Black and the Catholics

Halls
The venue has six halls:
 The Max (capacity: 1,500; opened in 1995, renovated in 2007), the largest room, hosts the biggest music acts and is also used for parties, meetings and film projections.
 The Old Hall (Oude Zaal) (capacity: 700) is the oldest concert hall of the venue, also the only one until the opening of "The Max" in 1995.
 The Rabo Hall (Rabozaal) (capacity: 1,400) is in a separate building and mostly hosts film projections or theater plays.
 The Theater Hall (Theaterzaal) (capacity: 90-130) is a small hall used for smaller artists and theatre plays.
 The Cinema (capacity: 90) is a private film projection hall.
 The Exhibition space (Expo) is used for art exhibitions.

References

External links
 
 
Viberate profile

1970 establishments in the Netherlands
Concert halls in Amsterdam
Music venues in the Netherlands